New York Forum may refer to:

 Austrian Cultural Forum New York, a network of Austrian Cultural Forums founded in New York
 411 New York Forum, a community-driven site by on life in New York City and surrounding areas
 New York Times Youth Forum, a public affairs program that ended June 14, 1953
 The New York Forum, a meeting of business leaders at the Grand Hyatt Hotel, New York